Court Up North is a two-part documentary by the ABC. The documentary explores the issues surrounding the criminal law system in the Northern Territory, particularly in relation to remote communities and Indigenous Australians.

Australian Broadcasting Corporation original programming